Eivind Gullberg Jensen (born 1 April 1972) is a Norwegian conductor.

Biography
Jensen studied violin and conducting in Trondheim. He continued his conducting studies with Jorma Panula in Stockholm and in Vianna with Leopold Hager.  Jensen has also participated in conducting master classes with Kurt Masur and David Zinman.  From 2009 to 2014, Jensen was chief conductor of the NDR Radiophilharmonie.  In June 2019, Bergen National Opera announced the appointment of Jensen as its next general director and artistic director, effective in 2021.

In 2018, Jensen first guest-conducted the Noord Nederlands Orkest (NNO).  Jensen returned to the NNO for two additional guest-conducting engagements, the most recent in September 2021.  In October 2021, the NNO announced the appointment of Jensen as its next chief conductor, effective with the 2022-2023 season.

Jensen is married to the Norwegian soprano Mari Eriksmoen, and lives in Bergen with their two daughters. He also has two children from a prior relationship.

References

External links

 HarrisonParrott agency page on Eivind Gullberg Jensen
 NDR Radiophilharmonie page on Eivind Gullberg Jensen

1972 births
Living people
Norwegian composers
Norwegian male composers
Norwegian expatriates in Germany